Rustam Ashurmatov (Uzbek Cyrillic: Рустам Ашурматов; born 7 July 1996), sometimes spelt as Rustamjon Ashurmatov, is an Uzbek footballer who plays as a defender for Russian club FC Rubin Kazan.

Career

Club
On 7 February 2019, FC Bunyodkor announced that Ashurmatov had joined Gwangju.

On 19 January 2021, Gangwon FC announced that Ashurmatov had joined Gangwon. Gangwon announced that Ashurmatov left the club on 15 February 2022.

On 18 February 2022, Ashurmatov signed with Navbahor Namangan.

On 14 January 2023, Ashurmatov joined FC Rubin Kazan in Russia on a 3.5-year contract.

International
A player for the Uzbekistan national football team since 2017, Ashurmatov has also have played for the Uzbekistan national youth teams in international tournaments such as 2013 FIFA U-17 World Cup, 2015 FIFA U-20 World Cup, and 2018 AFC U-23 Championship, in which he would win the latter tournament with Uzbekistan national under-23 football team, with him scoring in the final.

Honours

Gwangju FC

K League 2: 2019

Uzbekistan U-23

 AFC U-23 Championship (1): 2018

References

External links
 
 
 

Living people
1996 births
Uzbekistani footballers
Uzbekistan international footballers
FC Bunyodkor players
Gwangju FC players
Uzbekistan Super League players
K League 2 players
K League 1 players
Gangwon FC players
Navbahor Namangan players
FC Rubin Kazan players
Association football defenders
Footballers at the 2018 Asian Games
Asian Games competitors for Uzbekistan
Uzbekistani expatriate footballers
Expatriate footballers in South Korea
Uzbekistani expatriate sportspeople in South Korea
Expatriate footballers in Russia
Uzbekistani expatriate sportspeople in Russia